Orophia hadromacha is a species of moth in the family Depressariidae. It was described by Edward Meyrick in 1937, and is known from Mozambique.

References

Orophia
Moths of Sub-Saharan Africa
Lepidoptera of Mozambique
Endemic fauna of Mozambique
Moths described in 1937
Taxa named by Edward Meyrick